Eden Bay is an Arctic waterway in Qikiqtaaluk Region, Nunavut, Canada. Located off northern Melville Island's Sabine Peninsula, the bay is an arm of Byam Martin Channel. Sherard Bay is to the south.

References

Bays of Qikiqtaaluk Region